Anneux is a commune in the Nord department in northern France.

Its church is dedicated to Saint Léger.

History
Anneux was among the villages fought over at the western end of the Battle of Cambrai (1917).

Population

Heraldry

See also
Communes of the Nord department

References

External links

 Aujourd'hui à Anneux (in French)
 Anneux in the Battle of Cambrai

Communes of Nord (French department)